Taras Stepanovych Sakiv (born 19 November 1997) is a Ukrainian footballer who plays as a defender who plays for Karpaty Lviv.

Career
Sakiv is a product of the different youth sportive schools. In 2014, he played in the Ukrainian amateur competition for the club FC Enerhetyk Burshtyn. From winter 2015 he continued his career in the Ukrainian Premier League Reserves club FC Vorskla Poltava.

In March 2017 Sakiv was promoted to the main-squad team of FC Vorskla in the Ukrainian Premier League. He made his debut as a substituted player for Vorskla Poltava in the Ukrainian Premier League in a match against FC Volyn Lutsk on 1 April 2017.

In January 2023 he moved to Karpaty Lviv.

References

External links
 
 

1997 births
Living people
People from Burshtyn
Ukrainian footballers
Association football defenders
FC Enerhetyk Burshtyn players
FC Vorskla Poltava players
FC Rukh Lviv players
FC Mynai players
FC Kolos Kovalivka players
FC Inhulets Petrove players
FC Karpaty Lviv players
Ukrainian Premier League players
Ukrainian First League players
Sportspeople from Ivano-Frankivsk Oblast